Grant Gershon (born November 10, 1960) is a Grammy Award winning American conductor and pianist. He is Artistic Director of the Los Angeles Master Chorale, Resident Conductor of the Los Angeles Opera, member of the Board of Councillors for the USC Thornton School of Music and a member of the Chorus America Board of Directors.

Biography

Personal history
Gershon was born in Norwalk, California, and grew up in Alhambra, California. His mother was a piano teacher, and he began music lessons at 5 years old. After graduating from Alhambra High School, he entered Chapman College in Orange, California as a double major in piano and voice; he later transferred to the University of Southern California where he majored in piano. He eventually graduated cum laude with a Bachelor of Music degree in 1985.

Gershon is married to soprano Elissa Johnston.

Professional career
Gershon has appeared as guest conductor with the Los Angeles Philharmonic, the National Symphony Orchestra, the Baltimore Symphony Orchestra, the San Francisco Symphony, San Francisco Opera, Houston Grand Opera, Santa Fe Opera, Minnesota Opera, Royal Swedish Opera, Juilliard Opera Theatre, Saint Paul Chamber Orchestra, Los Angeles Chamber Orchestra, the Gustav Mahler Chamber Orchestra and the Finnish Avanti! Chamber Orchestra, among others. He has led performances at many of the world's most prestigious festivals, including the Ravinia, Edinburgh, Vienna, Aspen, Ojai and Helsinki festivals as well as the Roma-Europa Festival and the Festival Otonno in Madrid.

He served as Assistant Conductor / Principal Pianist with Los Angeles Opera from 1988 to 1994, where he participated in over 40 productions and garnered a reputation as one of the country's exceptional vocal coaches. He was named Assistant Conductor of the Los Angeles Philharmonic under Esa-Pekka Salonen in 1994, a position he held until 1997.

Early in his career he served as Assistant Conductor at the Salzburg Festival, the Berlin State Opera and the Aix-en-Provence Festival, working with conductors Esa-Pekka Salonen, Daniel Barenboim and Claudio Abbado. He has served as pianist for many artists on recording and in recital, including Kiri Te Kanawa, Peter Schreier, Rod Gilfry and Audra McDonald.

In May 2000, Gershon was named Music Director of the Los Angeles Master Chorale effective Fall 2001, taking over for Paul Salamunovich who was retiring. He is only the fourth conductor to hold that title. During this time, he has conducted over 200 performances at the Walt Disney Concert Hall, and has led the chorus in a number of world premieres, including:
 Iri da Iri by Esa-Pekka Salonen
 "the national anthems" by David Lang
 Inscapes by Swan Family Composer-in-Residence Shawn Kirchner
 You Are (Variations) by Steve Reich
 Requiem by Christopher Rouse
 The City of Dis by Louis Andriessen
 "Los cantores de las montañas" (The Singing Mountaineers) by Gabriela Lena Frank
 Plath Songs by Shawn Kirchner
 A Map of Los Angeles by David O
 SANG by Eve Beglarian
 Messages and Brief Eternity by Bobby McFerrin and Roger Treece, lyrics by Don Rosler
 Broken Charms by Donald Crockett
 Rezos (Prayers) by Tania León
 Mother's Lament by Sharon Farber
 The Salvage Men by Jeff Beal
 Mangá Pakalagián (Ceremonies) by Nilo Alcala
 Ave Maria/Scarborough Fair by Paul Chihara
 In the Desert With You by Moira Smiley
He led the U.S. premiere of Two Songs to Poems of Ann Jäderlund by Esa-Pekka Salonen with the Master Chorale, along with other U.S. premieres of works by composers James MacMillan, Tarik O'Regan, Sofia Gubaidulina and Mark-Anthony Turnage.

Beyond his work with the Master Chorale, he has also championed new music. He conducted the world premiere of John Adams opera Girls of the Golden West and Adams' opera/theatre piece, I Was Looking at the Ceiling and Then I Saw the Sky, directed by Peter Sellars. He and pianist Gloria Cheng premiered Hallelujah Junction, a piano-duo piece written for them by John Adams. In February 2007, he conducted the world premiere of Ricky Ian Gordon's opera, The Grapes of Wrath with Minnesota Opera, along with following performances with Utah Opera. In 2010, Gershon led the world premiere performances of Il Postino by Daniel Catán, featuring Plácido Domingo as the poet Pablo Neruda.

On May 21, 2007, the Los Angeles Opera and Los Angeles Master Chorale issued a joint press release. In it, they announced that Gershon would be extending his contract with the Master Chorale through the 2010/2011 season, and that he was being named Associate Conductor/Chorus Master of Los Angeles Opera. In the press release, Plácido Domingo called Gershon, "an exceptional musician whose broad musical interests, technical mastery and impressive experience will be a huge asset to LA Opera". In this position at LA Opera Gershon has conducted over 50 performances including La traviata, Madama Butterfly, Carmen, Philip Glass's Satyagraha, Handel's L'Allegro, il Penseroso ed il Moderato in Mark Morris's production, and the previously cited Il Postino.

On May 18, 2014, the Los Angeles Master Chorale issued a press release, in which they announced that Gershon would be extending his contract with the Master Chorale through the 2019/2020 season. With this renewal, Gershon's title will change to Artistic Director, which reflects his desire to "redefine the choral experience". With this expanded role, Gershon will create an "immersive" concert experience by incorporating lighting, staging, video, movement, and attire into the production. The Chorale will seek to engage new audiences by presenting more concerts at venues outside of Disney Hall and the Hollywood Bowl.

Recordings
Gershon has made seven recordings with the Los Angeles Master Chorale:
 Itaipú by Philip Glass and Two Songs to Poems of Ann Jäderlund by Esa-Pekka Salonen (RCM 12004)
 You Are (Variations) by Steve Reich (Nonesuch)
 Daniel Variations by Steve Reich (Nonesuch)
 A Good Understanding by Nico Muhly (Decca)
 Miserere by Henryk Górecki (Decca)
 the national anthems by David Lang (Cantaloupe)
 A Festival of CarolsGershon has conducted two DVD releases with LA Opera featuring Plácido Domingo
 Il Postino by Daniel Catán
 Gianni Schicchi by Giacomo Puccini

He has also served as chorus master on the Grammy Award winning recording of John Corigliano's The Ghosts of Versailles with LA Opera.

Awards and recognition
 In 2022, Gershon received the Grammy Award for Best Choral Performance.
 Also in 2022, he received the Michael Korn Award—Chorus America’s highest honor
 In 2017, the Los Angeles Master Chorale was inducted into the Classical Music Hall of Fame
 In 2015, Gershon received the Louis Botto Award for Entrepreneurial Zeal and Innovative Action from Chorus America
 In 2012, under Gershon's direction the Los Angeles Master Chorale received the Margaret Hillis Award for Choral Excellence from Chorus America.
 Gershon was honored with the WQXR Gramophone America Award for 2006 for his recording of Reich's You Are (Variations). In addition, The New York Times, The Washington Post and Newsday'', among others, selected it as one of the top ten classical recordings of 2005.
 He was named USC Thornton School of Music Outstanding Alumnus of the Year in May 2002

References

External links
 Bio (short version) – Los Angeles Master Chorale website
 Bio (long version) – Los Angeles Master Chorale website
 Bio on USC Thornton School of Music Board of Advisors website
 Bio on Los Angeles Philharmonic website

American choral conductors
American male conductors (music)
Chapman University alumni
USC Thornton School of Music alumni
Living people
1960 births
People from Norwalk, California
People from Alhambra, California
Musicians from Los Angeles
USC Thornton School of Music faculty
20th-century American conductors (music)
20th-century American pianists
21st-century American conductors (music)
21st-century American pianists
Classical musicians from California
20th-century American male musicians
21st-century American male musicians